The Acer Chromebook Tab 10 (D651N) is a tablet computer manufactured by Acer Inc. It is the first ChromeOS tablet that was released. It gets software updates until 2023. The tablet was announced in March 2018.

Specifications 
The SoC is a Rockchip OP1. It has 4GiB RAM and 32GiB of storage, which can be extended with a MicroSD card. It has a 9.7" inch display with a resolution of 2048×1536, with a dpi of 264. The code name of the device is scarlet.

It is primarily designed for education.

Reception 
TechRadar noted the excellent screen. PCMag noted that ChromeOS without a keyboard poses some problems.

References

External links 

 Acer.com - Chromebook Tab 10

Tablet computers